Walter may refer to:

People
 Walter (name), both a surname and a given name
 Little Walter, American blues harmonica player Marion Walter Jacobs (1930–1968)
 Gunther (wrestler), Austrian professional wrestler and trainer Walter Hahn (born 1987), who previously wrestled as "Walter"
 Walter, standard author abbreviation for Thomas Walter (botanist) ( – 1789)
 Walter, pen name of the writer of My Secret Life

Companies
 American Chocolate, later called Walter, an American automobile manufactured from 1902 to 1906
 Walter Energy, a metallurgical coal producer for the global steel industry
 Walter Aircraft Engines, Czech manufacturer of aero-engines

Films and television
 Walter (1982 film), a British television drama film
 Walter Vetrivel, a 1993 Tamil crime drama film
 Walter (2014 film), a British television crime drama
 Walter (2015 film), an American comedy-drama film
 Walter (2020 film), an Indian crime drama film
 W*A*L*T*E*R, a 1984 pilot for a spin-off of the TV series M*A*S*H
 Walter and Tandoori (original title Walter), a Canadian animated television series

Places

United States
 Walter, Alabama
 Walter Township, Minnesota

Other uses
 Walter (crater), on the Moon, more commonly known as Diophantus
 Walter (Muppet), a Muppet that first appeared in the 2011 film, The Muppets
 Walter (Lapinot), a comic strip by French cartoonist Lewis Trondheim
 Walter One, an android in the film Alien: Covenant
 Walter the Whale, an early star captive orca (killer whale) in 1967

See also
 Walser (surname)
 Walters (disambiguation)
 Walters (surname)
 Walther (disambiguation)
 Wolter, a given name and surname